The second Cowper ministry was the fourth ministry of the Colony of New South Wales, and second occasion of being led by Charles Cowper.

Cowper was elected in the first free elections for the New South Wales Legislative Assembly held in March 1856, and fought unsuccessfully with Stuart Donaldson to form Government. When Donaldson's Government faltered a little over two months after it was formed, Cowper formed Government on the first occasion, but he also lost the confidence of the Assembly a few months later. Henry Parker formed Government, lasting a little under twelve months, until it lost an electoral bill, when Cowper was again asked to form Government.

The title of Premier was widely used to refer to the Leader of Government, but not enshrined in formal use until 1920.

There was no party system in New South Wales politics until 1887. Under the constitution, ministers were required to resign to recontest their seats in a by-election when appointed. On this occasion all 4 ministers appointed in September 1857 were re-elected unopposed. Robert Campbell and John Robertson were appointed in January 1858 however no by-elections were held as the Legislative Assembly had been dissolved for the general election which was held between 13 January and 12 February 1858. William Dalley was re-elected unopposed in November 1858. John Hargrave was not a member of parliament at the time he was appointed Solicitor General. Hargrave had resigned as a judge of the District Court and the member for East Camden, Robert Owen, was appointed to replace him. Hargrave won Owen's former seat at the by-election on 21 March 1859. Edward Flood was re-elected unopposed on his appointment in October 1859.

This ministry covers the period from 7 September 1857 until on 26 October 1859, when Cowper resigned his commission, having lost an educational bill. Cowper resigned from the Assembly on the next day. During the period of this ministry, there were many arrangements, with no fewer than 13 men holding the seven positions in its life of just over two years.

Composition of ministry

 
Ministers are members of the Legislative Assembly unless otherwise noted.

See also

Self-government in New South Wales
Members of the New South Wales Legislative Assembly, 1856–1858
Members of the New South Wales Legislative Assembly, 1858–1859
First Cowper ministry (1856)
Third Cowper ministry (1861–1863)
Fourth Cowper ministry (1865–1866)
Fifth Cowper ministry (1870)

References

New South Wales ministries
1857 establishments in Australia
1859 disestablishments in Australia